Ariel Armando Kippes (born 25 February 1994) is an Argentinian footballer who plays for Brown de Adrogué in the Primera Nacional.

References

External links

1994 births
Living people
Argentine footballers
Association football defenders
People from Moreno Partido
Sportspeople from Buenos Aires Province
Club Atlético Sarmiento footballers
Club Atlético Brown footballers
Argentine Primera División players
Primera Nacional players